The Propagandawerfer 41 was a rocket launcher for the associated non-lethal Propagandagranate 41 rocket.  The launcher and rocket were a light man-portable system fired by specially-trained propaganda troops during World War II to distribute leaflets.

Description

Launcher 
The Propagandawerfer 41 consisted of a light  steel tube framework.  The base of the launcher was triangular in shape and had a crossbar through the center with a hinge that connected the base to a circular launch cage.  At the tip of the base there was an adjustable arm for elevating the launch cage and in the center of the launch cage was a trough which the Propagandagranate 41 rocket was launched from.  The rocket rested at the top of the cage until the crew pulled a lanyard, the rocket then slid down until it hit a firing pin which launched the rocket.

Rocket 
The Propagandagranate 41 was constructed of a plastic nose cone which held 200 leaflets weighing  that were rolled around a coiled spring and a metallic base which held the solid rocket. When the rocket was fired propellant gasses were forced through a steel base plate that had angled venturis drilled in it to impart spin.

Notes

External links
 http://www.psywarrior.com/dissemination.html

Rocket artillery
World War II artillery of Germany
World War II propaganda
Weapons and ammunition introduced in 1941